The St. Louis and San Francisco Railway Depot in Comanche, Texas, also known as the Frisco Depot and as the Comanche Depot,  was listed on the National Register of Historic Places in 2017.

It was built in 1909 as a depot of the St. Louis and San Francisco Railway.

It was restored in 2011.

References

Former railway stations in Texas
National Register of Historic Places in Comanche County, Texas
Buildings and structures completed in 1909